Lachheb is a surname. Notable people with the surname include:

Adli Lachheb (born 1987), Tunisian footballer 
Khalid Lachheb (born 1975), French pole vaulter
Tahar Lachheb, Tunisian paralympic athlete